Pine Lake is a lake in Clearwater County, Minnesota, in the United States.

Pine Lake was named for the forests of white and Norway pines which were cleared by early settlers.

See also
List of lakes in Minnesota

References

Lakes of Minnesota
Lakes of Clearwater County, Minnesota